
The Batura Muztagh mountains are a sub-range of the Karakoram mountain range. They are located in between central Hunza and upper Hunza (Gojal Valley) in the Hunza District of Gilgit-Baltistan province in northern Pakistan.

They are the westernmost sub-range of the Karakoram, running from Chalt village in Bar Valley in the east to Kampir Dior in the Kurumbar Valley in the west, and they separate the Hindu Raj range from the Karakoram range. The Muchu Chhish peak located in this sub-range remains the second highest unclimbed peak in the world.

Selected peaks in the Batura Muztagh

Books, pamphlets, and maps about Batura Muztagh
High Asia: An Illustrated History of the 7000 Metre Peaks by Jill Neate, 
Batura Mustagh (sketch map and pamphlet) by Jerzy Wala, 1988.
Orographical Sketch Map of the Karakoram by Jerzy Wala, 1990. Published by the Swiss Foundation for Alpine Research.

See also
 List of Highest Mountains of the World
 List of mountains in Pakistan

Notes
  This data is from the Himalayan Index and is not always correct. In particular it is not clear if Batura Sar has really had four ascents or only three.
  Sometimes called Batura I.
  Sometimes called Ultar II or Bojohagur Duanasir II.
  Also known as Sang-e-Marmar (or Sangemarmar), and sometimes referred to by locals as Marble Peak.
  The heights given for this peak vary between 6949m and 7050m.
  This elevation is approximate.

References

External links 

Himalayan Index
A clickable map of the Batura Muztagh
DEM files for the Himalaya (Corrected versions of SRTM data; look for the "Batura Sar" tile)

Mountain ranges of the Karakoram
Mountain ranges of Gilgit-Baltistan